The Weather Classroom is an educational program for children that aired on The Weather Channel from 1993 to 2007. It was part of the Cable in the Classroom initiative, and aired at a time when the show could be recorded for later showings in the classroom. Reruns aired until 2013.

Program History
The Weather Classroom has taken on many forms on TWC throughout the years. The program started in the early '90s on TWC and was hosted by various on-camera meteorologists who discussed various weather topics. In the early 2000s a new series was created and hosted by non-meteorologists. In 2006, repeats on the Forecast Earth series began to air as part of The Weather Classroom.

Schedule
Saturdays and Sundays
4 a.m. to 4:30 a.m. Eastern Time

References

The Weather Channel original programming
1993 American television series debuts
2007 American television series endings